The 1974–75 Liga Alef season saw Maccabi Haifa (champions of the North Division) and Maccabi Ramat Amidar (champions of the South Division) promoted to Liga Leumit.

Although two clubs in each regional division were due to be relegated, they were eventually reprieved after the Israel Football Association decided to expand Liga Leumit to 18 clubs, and Liga Alef to 17 clubs in each division for the following season.

North Division

South Division

References
Liga Alef North Davar, 11.5.75, Historical Jewish Press 
Amidar fulfilled old dream Davar, 18.5.75, Historical Jewish Press 
Previous seasons The Israel Football Association 

Liga Alef seasons
Israel
2